Chester Township, Ohio, may refer to:

Chester Township, Clinton County, Ohio 
Chester Township, Geauga County, Ohio 
Chester Township, Meigs County, Ohio 
Chester Township, Morrow County, Ohio 
Chester Township, Wayne County, Ohio

Ohio township disambiguation pages